Plaza Theatre or Plaza Theater may refer to:

Australia
Plaza Theatre, Adelaide, a former theatre in Adelaide, South Australia, now demolished
 Plaza Theatre, Paddington, Brisbane, Queensland, a cinema built from 1929, now known as Empire Revival
 Plaza Theatre, Perth, Western Australia, a cinema opened in 1937
 Plaza Theatre, Sydney, New South Wales, a former theatre, now heritage-listed building

India
Plaza Theatre (Bangalore)

United States

Plaza Theater (Tucson), Arizona
Plaza Theatre (Palm Springs), California
Plaza Theatre (Atlanta), Georgia
Plaza Theatre (El Paso), Texas
Plaza Theatre Company, Cleburne, Texas
Plaza Theatre (Charleston, West Virginia), a historic building